Canberra Grammar School is a co-educational, independent, day and boarding school located in Red Hill, a suburb of Canberra, the capital of Australia.

The school is affiliated with the Anglican Church of Australia and provides an education from pre-school to Year 12 for boys and girls.  In October 2015, the school announced that it would extend co-education to all years, commencing in 2016 with an intake of girls in Years 3 and 4. By 2018, the school became fully co-educational.

The school was founded in 1929 when the existing Monaro Grammar School was relocated to Canberra from Cooma. The foundation stone was laid on 4 December 1928 by Prime Minister Stanley Bruce. Initially, it was attended by only 63 students, but the school has grown considerably since the early 1950s to a total attendance of 1,749 students as of June 2015.

The school has educated one Australian Prime Minister and has a long list of notable alumni.

The school consists of 5 main campuses: Red Hill Southside, Red Hill Primary, Red Hill Senior, the Early Learning Center (ELC) and Northside Campbell.

Curriculum
In the primary school, the Australian Curriculum and Early Years Learning Framework requirements are incorporated through International Baccalaureate Primary Years Programme.

In the senior school, from years 7 to 10, the school follows the Australia Curriculum and the ACT Every chance to learn curriculum framework. Unlike other schools in the Australian Capital Territory, Canberra Grammar School does not follow the ACT Year 12 Curriculum. Instead, it is the only school in the ACT where students in years 11 and 12 have the option to study either the New South Wales Higher School Certificate (HSC) or the International Baccalaureate Diploma Programme. In 2012, Canberra Grammar became an International Baccalaureate World School.

Co-curricular
Canberra Grammar School is a member of the Associated Southern Colleges (ASC). The school offers many activities outside school hours. These include sport, music and other activities.
Junior School: athletics, adventure club, ball games, basketball, chess, cricket, cross country running, drama, European handball, gardening, golf, indoor soccer, mini volleyball, multimedia, orienteering, rugby, art, swimming, tae kwon do, tennis and triathlon.
Senior School: athletics club, alternate reality club (ARC), badminton, basketball, CGS Academy (Yr 11 & 12 tutoring for younger students), chess, Code Cadets, community service, cricket, cross country, Cru (Christian Group), debating, dragon boating, drama, Duke of Edinburgh awards, Equestrian Club,  football (soccer), golf, hockey, mountain biking,  netball, orienteering, outdoor education, rowing, rugby, sailing, snowsports, strength and conditioning, STEM Club, Sustainable CGS, swimming,  tae kwon do, tennis, Thucydides club and water polo.
Junior School Music: Junior School Chorale, Junior Choir, Senior Choir, String Orchestra, Concert Band and the Canberra Grammar School Stage Band.
Senior School Music is made up of two streams of performance groups:
The Advanced Musicians Program consists of a senior (higher level) concert band, Chamber Orchestra, senior jazz band, senior percussion ensemble, brass ensemble and Motet. These students have high level performance opportunities.
The large ensemble program provides larger ensemble-based experiences, including two concert bands, junior (lower level) jazz band, two string ensembles, a choir, an electric guitar ensemble, junior percussion ensemble and a piano ensemble.

Many of the Senior School ensembles have done numerous tours overseas over the years.

The school also holds a major musical every two years. Previous productions have included: 
Grease (2021), Chess (2020-cancelled due to Covid), The Pirates of Penzance (2018) Barnum (2015) and Guys and Dolls (2013).

Houses

List of houses 
As with most Australian schools, Canberra Grammar utilises a house system. The Senior School consists of ten houses:

The school also has three Year 7 houses these houses were not updated.

The Junior School has six houses introduced in 2022. These houses were named after local flora and fauna using the traditional Indigenous language of the Ngunnawal people:

The Junior School's original four houses, in place till 2021:

Most of these houses are in the upper years.

Inter-house competitions 

Houses form the basis of much of the inter-school competition that occurs throughout the academic calendar. Currently, the three prizes ‘\awarded annually to houses are: the Manaro House Shield, the Captain's Cup, and the Sportsmaster's Cup.

Manaro House Shield 
Events:

 Swimming
 Cross country 
 Athletics
 Athletics Standards
 House music (shout, rock, 4-20 voices (a capella) and instrumental) 
 Effort grades

The House Shield is currently held by Garnsey House.

Captains' Cup 
The exact events of the Captains' Cup are at the discretion of the captains and vice-captains of the school, and thus vary on a year-to-year basis. Typical events include:

 Soccer
 Cricket 
 Netball (since 2018)
 Medical warfare (dodge-ball) 
 Debating 
 Chess
 Basketball
Mario Kart
 The CGS Race

Typically, a "CGS All Star" team is selected from players in the competition to compete against the champion house in each event.

The Captains' Cup is currently held by Edwards House.

Sportsmaster's Cup 
The Sportsmaster's Cup is determined by:

 Spirit
 Attendance
 Participation

The Sportsmaster's Cup is currently held by Garran House.

Heads of school

Notable alumni
:See also :Category:People educated at Canberra Grammar School

Academia
Peter David Arthur Garnsey (1961)
Professor Geoffrey Garrett, political scientist
Professor Malcolm Gillies, Vice-Chancellor and President, City University, London; Vice-Chancellor, London Metropolitan University
Professor Jeffrey Grey, Australian military historian
Professor Toby Miller, sociologist

Business
Kerry Packer, publishing, media and gaming tycoon
Rowan Dean, advertising executive 
 Terry Snow, Executive Director of the Canberra Airport Group, Australian businessman (trained accountant), entrepreneur, and philanthropist

Media, entertainment and the arts
Richard Glover, author, journalist, ABC radio presenter
Alister Grierson, film director and scriptwriter
Francis James, RAF pilot and POW during WWII, journalist and publisher, activist against the Vietnam War
Peter Leonard, former WIN News Canberra reader
James O'Loghlin, ABC Sydney presenter
Dan O'Malley, author of The Rook
Fred Smith, musician, writer and diplomat
 Bill Birtles, ABC journalist

Politics, public service and the law
Henry Pike, Liberal National Party of Queensland Federal member for Bowman, Queensland
Wal Fife, Liberal Party of Australia Federal member for Hume, New South Wales
 Robert Piper, Deputy Special Coordinator for the Middle East Peace Process and the humanitarian coordinator for the Occupied Palestinian Territory, with the rank of UN Assistant Secretary General
 Shane Rattenbury, Member of the Australian Capital Territory Legislative Assembly, 2008–present and Speaker
 Andrew Refshauge, deputy Premier of New South Wales 1995–2005
 Richard Refshauge, ACT Supreme Court Justice
 Jon Richardson, Former Australian High Commissioner to Ghana (2004–08) and Nigeria (2013–15)
 Peter Webb, New South Wales State member for Monaro 1999–2003
 Gough Whitlam (Dux three years running), Prime Minister of Australia, 1972–1975
Andrew Constance, New South Wales State member for Bega 2003-2021

Sport
 Edward Bissaker, Junior World Champion cyclist
 Bob Brown, former Wallabies rugby union player
 Josh Bruce, St Kilda, Australian rules football player
 Andy Friend, ACT Brumbies former Head Coach
 David Gallop, former Chairman of the National Rugby League (NRL)
 Rod Kafer, Wallabies rugby union player
 Peter Kimlin, Wallabies rugby union player
 Michael Milton, world and Australian record holder, Winter Paralympic gold medalist
 Nick McDonald-Crowley, Olympic rower
 Cody Meakin, Australian wheelchair rugby paralympian
 Fergus Pragnell, Australian representative rower
 Guy Shepherdson, Wallabies rugby union player
 Ben Treffers, Junior World Champion swimmer
Richard Freedman, Horse trainer and media personality

Other
 David Eastman, former Dux found not guilty of murder on 22 November 2018, after a retrial on a quashed murder conviction
Dr James Muecke AM, Australian of the Year 2020 Class of 1981

See also
 List of schools in the Australian Capital Territory
 List of boarding schools
 Associated Southern Colleges

References

Further reading
 

Grammar schools in Australia
Boarding schools in the Australian Capital Territory
Member schools of the Headmasters' and Headmistresses' Conference
Educational institutions established in 1929
Anglican schools in the Australian Capital Territory
Private secondary schools in the Australian Capital Territory
International Baccalaureate schools in Australia
1929 establishments in Australia
Primary schools in the Australian Capital Territory